Joseph Li Shan (born March 1965 in Daxing District, Beijing) is a Chinese Catholic prelate who serves as Archbishop of Beijing. He was consecrated a bishop on 21 September 2007, at age 42 at a ceremony at Nan Tang (South Cathedral) in Xuanwumen. His main consecrator to become bishop was John Fang Xingyao. Before becoming archbishop he served as parish priest of Saint Joseph's Church in Wangfujing.

Shan also serves as the President of the Chinese Catholic Patriotic Association.

Biography
Li Shan was born in March 1965 in Daxing District, Beijing. 
His appointment as Archbishop of Beijing was approved by the Vatican. This approval was granted before his ordination, as happened for several other in the early years of the 21st century, unlike others, of an earlier period, of whom Pope Benedict XVI wrote that they, "under the pressure of particular circumstances, have consented to receive episcopal ordination without the pontifical mandate, but have subsequently asked to be received into communion with the Successor of Peter and with their other brothers in the episcopate. The Pope, considering the sincerity of their sentiments and the complexity of the situation, and taking into account the opinion of neighbouring Bishops, by virtue of his proper responsibility as universal Pastor of the Church, has granted them the full and legitimate exercise of episcopal jurisdiction."
 
He became a vice-president of the state-controlled Chinese Bishops' Conference and the Chinese Catholic Patriotic Association along with 16 other bishops who were assigned the same role in 2016. He became a representative on the Ethnic and Religious Affairs Committee for the 13th Chinese People's Political Consultative Conference in 2018. He became President of the Patriotic Association in 2022.

Views
Li Shan has spoken publicly in support of the Chinese government's push for Sinicization of religion in China, including support for the church in China selecting bishops on its own. In 2019 he made an address at the Beijing Catholic Forum for Sinicization of Theology further illustrating these views. On the occasion, he said: "Catholicism tells us that love for one's country is the fourth commandment of the decalogue...Be subject to every human institution for the Lord's sake...Supporting the leadership of the Communist Party and fervently loving our socialist motherland is the basic premise for upholding our country's direction to Sinicize religion." He spoke favourably of the efforts made thus far to sinicize the church in China as well as the history of the church in China since the episcopal reforms in the late 1950s.

In August 2022, at the 10th National Congress on Catholicism in China, Li Shan was elected President of the Chinese Patriotic Catholic Association (CPCA), The congress issued a statement reaffirming its commitment to sinicizataion, independence of the church, and increasing patriotism.

In 2007, Pope Benedict XVI said the CPCA was at odds with the role of the international Catholic Church, though the two have since reconciled with a formal agreement that the CPCA select bishops, which are approved or vetoed by the Holy See.

The CPCA is closely aligned with the pro-Sinicization policies of General Secretary of the Chinese Communist Party Xi Jinping, promoting the "one direction, one road and one flag" position of the Chinese Communist Party.

Activities
In 2011, Bishop Li Shan was co-consecrator along with six other bishops in a canonically illicit episcopal ordination for the bishop of Leshan. This act carried a possible penalty of excommunication for all involved, if they are considered imputable within the framework of canon law. The offence would not be imputable in canon law if the bishops who engaged in the act were coerced or under fear of coercion. 

On July 1, 2021, for celebrating the centenary celebrations of the founding of the Chinese Communist Party (CCP), Bishop Li Shan organized a watch party of CCP general secretary Xi Jinping's speech at the bishop's residence in Beijing.

In September 2021, he served as co-consecrator for Cui Qingqi's appointment as the new bishop of Wuhan. The appointment was done within the framework of the Sino-Vatican agreement.

On Christmas 2021, Bishop Li Shan announced a year for the 'Son of God', which followed 2021's 'Year of God'. The parishes in Beijing, which had suffered many closures due to Covid restrictions, reportedly developed their own pastoral programs to put into practice for celebrating this special year.

For Lent 2022, while churches in Beijing remained closed due to Covid restrictions, Bishop Li Shan issued a pastoral letter for Lent encouraging the faithful to engage in "abstinence from speech, eyes, ears, internet, bad temper and negative temperament". He also said to overcome the pandemic and its challenges "we need even more the power of faith". He also made a commitment to "accompany catechumens to live a life of holiness, incarnating the image of Jesus Christ".

On July 16, 2022, Bishop Li Shan held a mass at the North Cathedral where more than 100 people were initiated into the church. This was the first day that the church had been re-opened after having been closed since January of that year due to COVID restrictions.

On July 24, 2022, to celebrate the World Day of Grandparents and the Elderly, Bishop Li Shan held a special mass and did group photos as well as gave small symbolic gifts.

On August 15, 2022, the solemnity of the Assumption of the Virgin Mary, he gave mass at the North Cathedral in Beijing and said on the occasion: "We must imitate the fidelity and humility of Our Lady in our daily life and always pray according to her example".

In August 2022, he attended the 10th National Congress on Catholicism in China, where he was elected as President of the Patriotic Association. The congress issued a statement reaffirming its commitment to several principles including sinicizataion of the Catholic Church in China, independence of the church, increasing patriotism, as well as implementing the plans for the church made at the congress and to assimilate the spirit of the Central United Front Work Conference and the National Religious Work Conference, which had taken place in December of the previous year.

At the end of December 2022, the Beijing archdiocese announced that churches were going to be reopened on January 1. They had been previously shut down due to COVID restrictions. Bishop Li Shan gave a dispensation to the elderly, the seriously ill and people infected with Covid from Sunday Mass.

In February 2023, it was reported that Bishop Li Shan had given mandate to 11 extraordinary ministers of communion in Beijing to distribute communion to the homes of sick and elderly. 

In March 2023, it was reported that Bishop Li Shan had invited Bishop Stephen Chow of the diocese of Hong Kong to come to Beijing in April 2023. This was the first time a Hong Kong bishop had visited the mainland for decades.

See also 

 Joseph Ma Yinglin
 Joseph Liu Xinhong
 Zhan Silu

References

External links

 http://www.gcatholic.org/dioceses/diocese/peki0.htm

1965 births
Living people
21st-century Roman Catholic archbishops in China
Chinese Roman Catholic archbishops
Bishops of the Catholic Patriotic Association